Jeremy Barrett (born 1936) is an Australian artist.

His work is in the collection of the National Gallery of Victoria.

Notable exhibitions
"Jeremy Barrett: Survey Exhibition", solo show, 4 July - 23 August 2015, Castlemaine Art Gallery & Historical Museum, Castlemaine, Victoria, Australia

References

1936 births
Living people
Artists from Melbourne
Australian painters